Onur Ergün (born 15 November 1992), is a Turkish professional footballer who plays as a midfielder for Hatayspor.

Professional career
A youth product of Karşıyaka Belediyespor and Karşıyaka, Ergün begun his senior career with Menemenspor in 2008. He had stints with the semi-pro clubs Çiğli Belediyespor and 1928 Bucaspor from 2011 to 2013. In 2013, he transferred to İstanbulspor where he became the captain for 8 years, and helped the team get promoted into the TFF Second League and eventually the TFF First League. After his contract expired, he signed with Hatayspor on 15 July 2021. He made his professional debut with Hatayspor in a 1–1 Süper Lig tie with Kasımpaşa on 14 August 2021.

References

External links
 
 

1992 births
Living people
Sportspeople from Bingöl
Turkish footballers
Boluspor footballers
İstanbulspor footballers
Hatayspor footballers
Süper Lig players
TFF First League players
TFF Second League players
Association football midfielders